The 2014–15 UCLA Bruins women's basketball team represented the University of California, Los Angeles during the 2014–15 NCAA Division I women's basketball season. The Bruins, led by fourth year head coach Cori Close, play their home games at the Pauley Pavilion and were members of the Pac-12 Conference. The Bruins finished in 6th place in the Pac-12 Conference and were selected to play in the WNIT. The Bruins defeated the West Virginia Mountaineers 62–60 for the WNIT championship on April 4, 2015. Jordin Canada was the tournament's most valuable player.

Roster

Schedule

|-
!colspan=9 style="background:#0073CF; color:gold;"| Exhibition

|-
!colspan=9 style="background:#0073CF; color:gold;"| Non-conference regular season

|-
!colspan=9 style="background:#0073CF; color:gold;"| Pac-12 regular season

|-
!colspan=9 style="background:#0073CF;"| Pac-12 Women's Tournament

|-
!colspan=9 style="background:#0073CF;"| WNIT

Rankings

See also
2014–15 UCLA Bruins men's basketball team

References

UCLA
UCLA Bruins women's basketball
Women's National Invitation Tournament championship seasons